Chris Charles (born ) is an English former professional rugby league footballer who played in the 1990s and 2000s.

International honours
Chris Charles won a cap for England while at Salford in 2005 against France.

References

1976 births
Living people
Castleford Tigers players
England national rugby league team players
English rugby league players
Hull Kingston Rovers players
Place of birth missing (living people)
Rugby league hookers
Rugby league locks
Rugby league second-rows
Salford Red Devils players